Franz Ignaz Pruner (8 March 1808 - 29 September 1882); known as Pruner Bey during his stay in Egypt, was a German physician, ophthalmologist and anthropologist who was a native of Pfreimd, Oberpfalz.

Education
He studied medicine in Munich, and in 1831 took part in a scientific expedition to Egypt.

Practice 
While in Egypt he was appointed by viceroy Mehmed Ali (1769-1849) as chair of anatomy and physiology at the medical school in Abuzabel, near Cairo. This institution had recently been established in 1825 by French physician Antoine Clot (1793-1868). In 1832 he returned to Europe and studied with Francesco Flarer (1791–1859) in Pavia. Soon afterwards he returned to Cairo as director of a military hospital. Subsequently, he served as a professor of ophthalmology as well as director of the hospital at Kasr al Aini. In 1839 he became a physician to Egyptian royalty, and was given the title of bey. In 1860 he returned to Europe, eventually settling in Paris, where he performed anthropological research. After the outbreak of the Franco-Prussian War, he moved to Pisa, where he worked as a private scholar until his death in 1882.

Medical efforts
While in Egypt, Pruner dealt with the treatment of epidemics such as bubonic plague, cholera and typhoid fever. He also worked with tropical diseases, and was concerned with ophthalmic disorders that included trachoma and conjunctivitis. In 1847 he provided the first comprehensive description of pentastomiasis in humans.

Anthropology efforts
He is remembered today for his research in anthropology, linguistics, ethnology and ethnography. He published over 120 works in these fields, and in 1865 was appointed president of the Société d’Anthropologie in Paris.

Opinion about Negroid race
Pruner studied the racial structure of Negros in Egypt. In a book which he wrote in 1846 he claimed that Negro blood had a negative influence on the Egyptian moral character. He published a monograph on Negros in 1861. He claimed that the main feature of the Negros skeleton is prognathism, which he claimed was Negros relation to the ape. He also claimed that Negros had very similar brains to apes and that Negros have a shortened big toe which is a character which connects the Negros close to apes.

Selected writings 
 Tentamen de morborum transitionibus,  Munich 1830 (dissertation) - Examination of the contagiousness of diseases.
 Ist denn die Pest wirklich ein ansteckendes Übel?, Munich 1839 - Is Cholera really a contagious evil?
 Die Überbleibsel der altägyptischen Menschenrassen, Munich 1841 - Remnants of the ancient Egyptian races.
 Die Krankheiten des Orients vom Standpunkte der vergleichenden Nosologie betrachtet, Erlangen 1847 - Diseases of the Orient, from the standpoint of comparative nosology. 
 Topographie médicale du Caire avec le plan de la ville et des environs, Munich 1847 - Medical topography of Cairo with a plan of the city and its environs. 
 Die Weltseuche Cholera und die Polizei der Natur, Erlangen 1851 - The world cholera epidemic and nature's police. 
 Der Mensch im Raume und in der Zeit, Munich 1859 - Man in space and time.

References 
 This article is based on a translation of an article from the German Wikipedia.

German anthropologists
1808 births
1882 deaths
German ophthalmologists
Qasr El Eyni Hospital